Ma Shi Khana Pagoda is a Buddhist pagoda located in Sagaing, Myanmar.

According to tradition, the pagoda  was founded by Nga Tet Pya, a Robin Hood-like character, during the reign of the King Thado Minbya.

References 

Pagodas in Myanmar
Buddhist pilgrimage sites in Myanmar
Buildings and structures in Sagaing Region
Buddhist temples in Myanmar